Jorge Horacio Cavoti (20 February 1926 – 1981) was an Argentine equestrian. He competed at the 1956 Summer Olympics and the 1960 Summer Olympics.

References

External links
 

1926 births
1981 deaths
Argentine male equestrians
Argentine dressage riders
Olympic equestrians of Argentina
Equestrians at the 1956 Summer Olympics
Equestrians at the 1960 Summer Olympics
Sportspeople from Buenos Aires